Sir John Evans-Freke, 1st Baronet (1744 – 20 March 1777) was an Anglo-Irish politician. 

Born John Evans, he was the son of Hon. John Evans, a younger son of George Evans, 1st Baron Carbery, and Grace, daughter and heiress of Sir Ralph Freke, 1st Baronet. Between 1768 and his death he sat in the Irish House of Commons as the Member of Parliament for Baltimore. He was created a baronet, of Castle Freke in the Baronetage of Ireland, in 1768. Evans later assumed the surname of Freke. Upon his death, his title passed to his son, John Evans-Freke, who inherited the family peerage in 1807.

References

1744 births
1777 deaths
18th-century Anglo-Irish people
Baronets in the Baronetage of Ireland
Irish MPs 1769–1776
Irish MPs 1776–1783
Members of the Parliament of Ireland (pre-1801) for County Cork constituencies
People from County Cork